Abdelmajid Benjelloun (1919–1981) was a novelist, journalist and ambassador from Morocco.

Early life
He was born in Casablanca in 1919. His parents emigrated to England (Manchester) when he was only one year old. He returned to Morocco when he was ten. His auto-biographical novel Fi at-Tufula (In Childhood), published in 1957, was one of the first Moroccan novels in Arabic.

Bibliography
Poetry and novels
Fi at-Tufula (In Childhood), auto-biographical novel (1957)

On Abdelmajid Benjelloun:
Simon Gikandi, The Cambridge History of African and Caribbean Literature, p. 192
Rosa María Ruiz Moreno, "Abd al-Mayid ben Yellun (1915-1981): un pionero de la narrativa marroquí", in: Pérez Beltrán, Carmelo y Ruiz Almodóvar, Caridad (eds),  El Magreb : coordenadas socioculturales, 1996, pags. 487-504

External links
Literatura Marroqui Contemporanea (in Spanish) under 'Benyellun' 

Moroccan novelists
Moroccan male writers
Male novelists
Moroccan male short story writers
Moroccan short story writers
1919 births
1981 deaths
People from Casablanca
20th-century novelists
20th-century short story writers
20th-century male writers
Moroccan expatriates in the United Kingdom